Cortney Mansour or Mansourová (born December 15, 1994) is a Canadian-Czech ice dancer. With Michal Češka, she has won four international medals and three national titles. The two have reached the final segment at three ISU Championships.

Earlier in her career, she competed with Daryn Zhunussov for Kazakhstan.

Personal life 
Cortney Mansour was born on December 15, 1994 in Regina, Saskatchewan, Canada. She became a Czech citizen in December 2017. Her aunt skated for the Ice Capades.

Early career 
Mansour started learning to skate in 1996.

In the 2011–12 season, she competed with Daryn Zhunussov for Kazakhstan. After starting the season in the junior ranks, Mansour/Zhunussov decided to move up to the senior level. In January, they placed last at the 2012 Four Continents Championships in Colorado Springs, Colorado. In March, they competed at the 2012 World Championships in Nice, France; their placement in the preliminary round, 20th, was insufficient to qualify for the short dance.

Partnership with Češka

2013–14 season 
In 2013, Mansour teamed up with Michal Češka to compete for the Czech Republic, following a tryout in Europe. They were coached by Carol Lane, Jon Lane, and Juris Razgulajevs in Toronto, Ontario, Canada. Making their international debut, Mansour/Češka placed 12th at a Junior Grand Prix (JGP) event in Gdańsk in September 2013 and tenth the following month at JGP Ostrava in the Czech Republic. The duo finished 13th at the 2014 World Junior Championships in Sofia, Bulgaria, after placing 14th in both segments.

2014–15 season: Senior debut 
Mansour/Češka advanced to the senior level in the 2014–15 season. Competing in the Challenger Series, they placed ninth at the 2014 CS Nebelhorn Trophy and tenth at the 2014 CS Skate Canada Autumn Classic. Ranked 19th in the short dance and 15th in the free, they finished 17th at the 2015 European Championships in Stockholm, Sweden.

2015–16 season 
Mansour/Češka placed sixth at two Challenger Series events in the first half of October, the 2015 CS Ondrej Nepela Trophy and 2015 CS Finlandia Trophy. Deciding to change coaches, they joined Igor Shpilband in Novi, Michigan at the end of the month. The duo won gold at the Pavel Roman Memorial and then finished 13th at the 2016 European Championships in Bratislava after placing 14th in the short and 13th in the free. Ranked 24th in the short, they did not qualify for the free dance at the 2016 World Championships.

2016–17 season: Grand Prix debut 
In July 2016, Mansour/Češka received their first Grand Prix assignment, replacing Federica Testa / Lukas Csolley at the 2016 Trophée de France.

Programs

With Češka

With Zhunussov

Results 
GP: Grand Prix; CS: Challenger Series; JGP: Junior Grand Prix

With Češka for the Czech Republic

With Zhunussov for Kazakhstan

References

External links 

 
 

1994 births
Living people
Sportspeople from Regina, Saskatchewan
Czech female ice dancers
Kazakhstani female ice dancers
Canadian female ice dancers
Naturalized citizens of the Czech Republic
Canadian emigrants to the Czech Republic
Canadian emigrants to Kazakhstan
Canadian people of Kazakhstani descent
Figure skaters at the 2018 Winter Olympics
Olympic figure skaters of the Czech Republic
Naturalised sports competitors